Nijs Cornelis Korevaar (31 December 1927 – 1 December 2016) was a Dutch water polo player who won a European title in 1950. He competed in the 1948 and 1952 Summer Olympics and won a bronze medal in 1948, placing fifth in 1952. In 1948 he played all seven matches and scored four goals, and in 1952 he played all nine matches and scored at least three goals (not all scorers are known). Korevaar is the younger brother of the mathematician Jacob Korevaar. His son Jan Jaap Korevaar also became an Olympic water polo competitor.

See also
 List of Olympic medalists in water polo (men)

References

External links
 

1927 births
2016 deaths
Dutch male water polo players
Olympic bronze medalists for the Netherlands in water polo
People from Binnenmaas
Water polo players at the 1948 Summer Olympics
Medalists at the 1948 Summer Olympics
Water polo players at the 1952 Summer Olympics
Sportspeople from South Holland
20th-century Dutch people